

Group A

Head coach:  Dr. Mohamed Aly

Head coach:  Charnwit Polcheewin

Head coach:  Vladimir Bigorra

Head coach:  Bernd Stoeber

Group B

Head coach:  Joe McGrath

Head coach:  Mamadou Coulibaly

Head coach:  Jorge Vantolra

Head coach:  Juan Santisteban

Group C

Head coach:  Colin Dobson

Head coach:  Jay Miller

Head coach:  Paul Gludovatz

Head coach:  Carlos Cesar Ramos

Group D

Head coach:  José Pekerman

Head coach:  Emmanuel Afranie

Head coach:  Armando Rodríguez Chacon

Head coach:  Aziz Amin

Footnotes

Fifa U-17 World Championship Squads, 1997
FIFA U-17 World Cup squads